Deborah Meetze Hinton (born 1953) is an American microbiologist. She is a senior investigator and chief of the gene expression and regulation section in the laboratory of cell and molecular biology at the National Institute of Diabetes and Digestive and Kidney Diseases.

Life 
Hinton completed a B.S. at University of North Carolina at Chapel Hill in 1974. Her undergraduate honors thesis was titled Electrochemical generation of metal dendrites as field desorption emitters. Hinton earned a M.S. (1976) and Ph.D. (1980) from University of Illinois at Urbana–Champaign. Her dissertation was titled The synthesis of oligodeoxyribonucleotides with RNA ligase. Her doctoral advisor was R.I. Gumport. She was a postdoctoral fellow of the American Cancer Society from 1980 to 1982.

Hinton is a senior investigator and chief of the gene expression and regulation section in the laboratory of cell and molecular biology at the National Institute of Diabetes and Digestive and Kidney Diseases. She researches how the process of transcription initiation and activation is regulated at a molecular level. Her scientific focus areas include microbiology, infectious diseases, molecular biology, and biochemistry.

Hinton became a member of the American Society for Microbiology in 2009.

References 

Living people
Place of birth missing (living people)
National Institutes of Health people
21st-century American biologists
21st-century American women scientists
American medical researchers
Women medical researchers
American women biologists
American microbiologists
University of North Carolina at Chapel Hill alumni
University of Illinois Urbana-Champaign alumni
Women microbiologists
1953 births